Karolin is a Danish,  Finnish,  German,  Norwegian, and  Swedish feminine given name that is a diminutive form of Carolina and Caroline as well as an alternate form of Carolin. Karólín is an Icelandic feminine given name that is a diminutive form of Carola as well as a short form of Karolína.  Notable people referred to by this name include the following:

Given name
Karolin Braunsberger-Reinhold (born 1986), German politician
Karolin Luger, Austrian biochemist and biophysicist
Karolin Margret Natasa (born 1982), Indonesian politician
Karolin Ohlsson (born 1991), Swedish orienteering competitor
Karolin Thomas (born 1985), German football player
Karolin Wagner (born 1996), German slalom canoeist

Middle name
Sascha Karolin Aulepp (born 1970), German politician

See also

Karlin (surname)
Karoli
Karolien
Karolín
Karolina
Karoline
Karolyn

Notes

Danish feminine given names
Finnish feminine given names
German feminine given names
Icelandic feminine given names
Norwegian feminine given names
Swedish feminine given names